Aeolidioidea is a superfamily of sea slugs, the aeolid nudibranchs. They are marine gastropod molluscs in the suborder Cladobranchia.

Taxonomy 
As of 2019, the superfamily Aeolidioidea consisted of the following families:
 Aeolidiidae Gray, 1827
 Babakinidae Roller, 1973
 Facelinidae Bergh, 1889
 Flabellinopsidae Korshunova, Martynov, Bakken, Evertsen, Fletcher, Mudianta, Saito, Lundin, Schrödl & Picton, 2017
 Glaucidae Gray, 1827
 Myrrhinidae Bergh, 1905
 Notaeolidiidae Eliot, 1910
 Piseinotecidae Edmunds, 1970
 Pleurolidiidae Burn, 1966

Synonyms of families within this superfamily include:
 Caloriidae (accepted as Facelinidae)
 Cratenidae (accepted as Facelinidae)
 Favorinidae (accepted as Facelinidae)
 Phidianidae (accepted as Facelinidae)
 Phyllodesmiidae (accepted as Myrrhinidae)
 Protaeolidiellidae (accepted as Pleurolidiidae)
 Spurillidae (accepted as Aeolidiidae)

Gosliner et al. (2007) elevated the subfamily Babakininae, which was within Facelinidae, to the family level, as Babakinidae. A study of facelinid relationships in 2019 removed several facelinid genera to the family Myrrhinidae.

References

 
Taxa named by John Edward Gray